The 2021–22 South Florida Bulls men's basketball team represented the University of South Florida during the 2021–22 NCAA Division I men's basketball season. The season marked the 50th basketball season for USF, the ninth as a member of the American Athletic Conference, and the fifth season under head coach Brian Gregory. The Bulls played their home games at Yuengling Center on the university's Tampa, Florida campus. They finished the regular season 8–22, 3–15 in AAC play to finish in last place.

Previous season
In a season limited due to the ongoing COVID-19 pandemic, the Bulls finished the 2020–21 season 9–13, 4–10 in AAC play to finish in a tie for eighth place. They defeated Temple in the first round of the AAC tournament before losing to Wichita State in the quarterfinals.

Offseason

Departures

Incoming transfers

Recruiting classes

2021 recruiting class

2022 recruiting class

Roster

Schedule and results

|-
!colspan=12 style=| Exhibition

|-
!colspan=12 style=| Non-conference regular season

|-
!colspan=12 style=| AAC Regular Season

|-
!colspan=12 style=| AAC tournament

Source

References

South Florida Bulls men's basketball seasons
South Florida Bulls
South Florida Bulls men's b
South Florida Bulls men's b